The Image is a 1969 black and white short film directed by Michael Armstrong with starring Michael Byrne and David Bowie in his first film role. The film is one of the few short films ever to receive a certified 'X' Rating and it gained this rating due to its violent content.

Plot
A troubled artist (Michael Byrne) is haunted by a ghostly young man (David Bowie) who appears to step right out of one of the artist's paintings. From a brief summary located on the cover of the film's script, it reads: a study of the illusionary reality world within the schizophrenic mind of the artist at his point of creativity.

Cast
 David Bowie as The Boy
 Michael Byrne as The Artist

References

External links
 
 The Image - Script
 The Image at CINEBEATS

British short films
Films directed by Michael Armstrong
1969 films
1960s English-language films